Before…12:01…and After is a collection of science fiction, fantasy, mystery and horror stories by author Richard A. Lupoff. It was released in 1996 by Fedogan & Bremer in an edition of 2,100 copies of which 100 were signed by the author and the artist. Many of the stories originally appeared in the magazines Pagoda, Fantasy and Science Fiction, Heavy Metal, Fantastic, Whispers, Isaac Asimov's Science Fiction Magazine, Detective Story Magazine, Hardboiled and Ellery Queen's Mystery Magazine.

Contents
 "Foreword: About Dick Lupoff", by Robert Silverberg
 "Introduction: How I Learned to Read"
 "Mr. Greene and the Monster"
 "BOOM!"
 "Incident in the 14th St. BMT"
 "After the Dreamtime"
 "12:01 P.M."
 "Venus—Ah, Venus!"
 "With the Evening News"
 "Saltzman’s Madness"
 "God of the Naked Unicorn"
 "Nebogipfel at the End of Time"
 "Mort in Bed"
 "Stroka Prospekt"
 "Two Sort-Of Adventures"
 "Blinky Henderson Again"
 "The Digital Wristwatch of Philip K. Dick"
 "Snow Ghosts"
 "Triptych"
 "The House on Rue Chartres"
 "The Doom That Came to Dunwich"
 "The Woodstock West Killer"
 "Easy Living"
 "Dogwalker"
 "A Funny Thing Happened..."
 "A Richard A. Lupoff Bibliography", by Dave Nee

References

1996 short story collections
Science fiction short story collections
Fantasy short story collections
Horror short story collections
Mystery short story collections
Fedogan & Bremer books